The Touring Club Suisse (TCS) is a Swiss association representing the interests of drivers in Switzerland. With approximately 1.5 million members, the non-profit is the largest mobility club in Switzerland and one of the largest grassroot organizations in the country.

TCS offers a variety of services to its members (insurance, road assistance, driving courses, etc.) as well as leisure, with dozens of campgrounds dotting the country. It also carries out crash tests on all objects related to mobility, and occasionally engages in political lobbying with issues related to mobility.

Origin and structure
The TCS was founded in Geneva on September 1, 1896 by 205 cyclists with the aim of developing bicycle tourism. To this day the association remains a non-profit and is  headquartered in Vernier in the canton of Geneva.

Structurally, the TCS consists of 23 sections and a central Club. Each section delegates a representative who sits on the Board of Directors. It appoints a director who manages the Central Club’s business. The highest body is the Delegate Assembly, which represents all TCS members.

Activities
The TCS is known throughout Switzerland by its helpdesk service, reachable in Switzerland on 0800 140 140 and its 220 yellow patrol vehicles.

The ETI Booklet (Entraide Touristique Internationale, or International Tourist Assistance) is a travel insurance that covers the events that can take place before and during a travel abroad: breakdown service, legal protection, baggage insurance, cancellation insurance, remote medical advice, repatriation and medical expenses.

The legal protection service of the TCS was founded in 1958. It defends its members on the following topics: private legal protection, motorist's legal protection, real estate and internet.

The TCS also carries out product tests every year - child seats, tires, helmets, driving systems, etc. - as well as vehicles tests - cars, motorcycles, ebikes, scooters etc. - and publishes these tests for free to benefit the whole community. Since its creation, the TCS has been committed to road safety. It publishes brochures and leaflets for the use of its members and schools. It participates in national prevention campaigns funded by the Road Safety Fund. The TCS also conducts studies on the safety of the road infrastructure.

A privileged partner of the authorities, the TCS’ expertise is recognized at the Swiss level and it participates in all public consultations on the topic of road safety and mobility in general.

Once a month, TCS members receive the Touring magazine for free, published in French, German and Italian. The magazine’s editorial offices are centralized in Bern.

The TCS has 21 technical centers, 29 campsites and 15 driving training tracks.

The TCS has been a member of the International Automobile Federation (FIA) since 1998

References
 François Antoniazzi, Der Touring Club Schweiz im Spiegel von 100 Ereignissen 1896–1996, TCS Publishing, Geneva, 1996.
 Joseph Britschgi, Manuel d'enseignement de la circulation, TCS Publishing, Geneva, 1946.

External links 
 

Clubs and societies in Switzerland
1896 establishments in Switzerland
Automobile associations
Organizations established in 1896